Proper may refer to:

Mathematics 
 Proper map, in topology, a property of continuous function between topological spaces, if inverse images of compact subsets are compact
 Proper morphism, in algebraic geometry, an analogue of a proper map for algebraic varieties
 Proper transfer function, a transfer function in control theory in which the degree of the numerator does not exceed the degree of the denominator
 Proper equilibrium, in game theory, a refinement of the Nash equilibrium
 Proper subset
 Proper space
 Proper complex random variable

Other uses 
 Proper (liturgy), the part of a Christian liturgy that is specific to the date within the Liturgical Year
 Proper frame, such system of reference in which object is stationary (non moving), sometimes also called a co-moving frame
 Proper (heraldry), in heraldry, means depicted in natural colors
 Proper Records, a UK record label
 Proper (album), an album by Into It. Over It. released in 2011
 Proper (often capitalized PROPER), a corrected release in response to a previously released online video or movie that contains transcoding or other playback errors

See also
 Acceptable (disambiguation)